60 Water Street is a 17-story mixed-use building in the Dumbo section of Brooklyn in New York City. Designed by Ismael Leyva and Leeser Architecture, the mixed use building is located right next to the Brooklyn Bridge and features many sustainable considerations. The building envelope design uses pattern at two scales to enliven the surface of the residential tower project. Finished in Spring 2015, the building utilizes its staggered towers to create green features including a low-intensive green roof and a garden roof deck overlooking the Brooklyn Bridge.

Description
The building is composed of a three-level underground public parking garage; 10,000 square feet of ground floor retail space along Water Street; a full-floor, 45,000-square-foot public middle school to serve 300 students; and 220,000 square feet of rental apartments, 20% of which is designated for affordable housing.

Awards 
2014 Asia Property Award for Best Commercial Architectural Design.

References

NEW YORK TIMES: DUMBO Roars - Transforming Dumbo, a Brooklyn Neighborhood, With New Condos

External links 
 60 Water Street

Residential buildings in Brooklyn
Downtown Brooklyn
Dumbo, Brooklyn